Steven Spielberg (born December 18, 1946) is an American film director and producer.

Spielberg may also refer to:

 Spielberg (surname)
 Spielberg, Styria, a city in Styria, Austria
 known as the location of the Formula 1 Austrian Grand Prix at the Red Bull Ring (formerly A1-Ring)
 Spielberg (Baden), village in the municipality of Karlsbad, Baden-Württemberg, Germany
 Špilberk Castle in Brno, Czech Republic
 25930 Spielberg, main-belt asteroid
 SV Spielberg, German football club
 Spielberg (film), a 2017 HBO documentary film centered on the career of Steven Spielberg